Heart of Darkness is an extended play by no wave musicians No Trend and Lydia Lunch, released as a 10" vinyl in 1985 through Lunch's own Windowspeak label. The record includes four tracks that would all later appear on No Trend's sophomore studio album A Dozen Dead Roses, which shows a significant change in sound compared to the band's previous releases.

Track listing
All lyrics and music written by No Trend

Personnel

Performers
Jeff Mentges - Vocals, lyrics, layout (Credited as Jefferson Scott)
Lydia Lunch - Vocals
Dean Evangelista - Guitar
Robert "Smokeman" Marymont - Bass
Benard Demassy - Saxophone
Danny "Spidako" Demetro - Keyboards
Kenn Rudd - Drums

Production
Don Zientara - Recording, mixing
Richard Bangham - Graphics, photography

References

1985 EPs
No Trend albums